Zhou Liangen (born November 1965) is a former Chinese politician from Henan province. He was investigated by the Communist Party of China's anti-graft agency in November 2014. For several months in 2014, Zhou served as vice-mayor of Kaifeng, and concurrently the head of the Kaifeng Municipal Public Security Bureau, essentially the city's police chief.

Zhou had close relations with Qin Yuhai, the former vice-governor of Henan who also fell in a corruption probe.

Life and career
Zhou was born and raised in Xichuan County, Henan. He entered Zhengzhou University in September 1983, majoring in political law, where he graduated in July 1987. After college, he worked there.

Zhou joined the Communist Party of China in June 1987, and began his political career in July 1987.

He served in various posts in Education Section of Political Department of Henan Provincial Public Security, before serving as deputy director of Shangqiu Municipal Public Security Bureau.

From 2003 to 2012, he spent 9 years serving in various political roles in Henan Provincial Public Security.

In August 2012, he was appointed the vice-mayor of Hebi and party chief of Hebi Municipal Public Security Bureau, he remained in that positions until March 2014, when he was transferred to Kaifeng and appointed the vice-mayor, he concurrently served as director and party chief of Kaifeng Municipal Public Security Bureau.

Downfall
In October 2014, he was being investigated by the Party's internal disciplinary body for "serious violations of laws and regulations".

On November 18, 2016, he was sentenced to 3 years and fined 200,000 yuan for taking bribes by the Zhengzhou Intermediate People's Court.

References

1965 births
Politicians from Xichuan County, Henan
Living people
Political office-holders in Henan
Zhengzhou University alumni
Chinese Communist Party politicians from Henan
People's Republic of China politicians from Henan
Chinese police officers
Politicians from Nanyang, Henan